Eva Winther (née Fornander; 3 August 1921 – 26 May 2014) was a Swedish Liberal People's party politician who served as the minister for migration and gender equality in the period 1978–1979.

Early life and education
She was born in Stockholm on 3 August 1921 to Captain Martin Fornander and Gunhild Fornander. She received education in the field of paediatric nursing.

Career
Winther started her political career when she was elected to the Kiruna town council from the Liberal People's party in 1966 and remained in the post until 1976. Then she became a member of the Norrbotten county council and was elected to the Swedish parliament in the 1976 election. At the parliament she served as the chair of the labour market committee (1977–1978) and then as a member of the same committee (1979–1982). On 18 October 1978 Winther was named as the minister for migration and gender equality as part of the cabinet led by Prime Minister Ola Ullsten and she remained in the office until 12 October 1979. She served at the parliament until 1982. Then she became a member of the Halland county council in the period 1985–1991 and was the deputy chair of the council from 1988 to 1991.

Personal life and death
Winther was married and had three children, a son and two daughters. She died in Kungsbacka on 26 May 2014 and buried at the Skogskyrkogården cemetery in Stockholm.

References

External links

20th-century Swedish women politicians
21st-century Swedish women
1921 births
2014 deaths
Burials at Skogskyrkogården
Members of the Riksdag from the Liberals (Sweden)
Women government ministers of Sweden
Swedish Ministers for Gender Equality
Swedish Ministers for Migration and Asylum Policy
Swedish nurses
Politicians from Stockholm
Members of the Riksdag 1976–1979
Members of the Riksdag 1979–1982
Women members of the Riksdag